Photedes minima, the small dotted buff, is a species of moth of the family Noctuidae. It is found in Europe.

Technical description and variation

The wingspan is 20–23 mm. The length of the forewings is 11–14 mm. Forewing pale ochreous, slightly dusted with darker, and washed with pale ochraceous; the median area in female usually a little deeper coloured, especially in lower half; inner and outer lines fine, obscure, conversely lunulate-dentate, the teeth produced along the veins, sometimes paler-edged, generally marked only by vein-dashes; subterminal line faint, preceded by a diffuse dark shade, forming a patch at costa; hindwing ochreous, suffused with grey, thickly towards termen, with traces of a dark outer line; some specimens are more strongly suffused with ochraceous or rufous; these constitute the aberration lutescens Haw.

Biology
The moth flies from June to August depending on the location.

Larva ochreous, sometimes pinkish, with darker transverse bars at the segments; dorsal and subdorsal lines paler; head brown; thoracic plate paler brown. The larvae feed on tufted hair-grass en Deschampsia flexuosa.

References

External links

Small dotted buff at UKmoths
Funet Taxonomy
Fauna Europaea
Lepiforum.de
Vlindernet.nl 

Hadeninae
Moths of Europe
Moths described in 1809
Taxa named by Adrian Hardy Haworth